Herbert Theodore Bradley (January 3, 1903 – October 16, 1959) was a right-handed pitcher in Major League Baseball who played from 1927 through 1929 for the Boston Red Sox.

In a three-season career, Bradley posted a 1–4 record with 20 strikeouts and a 5.93 ERA in 74.1 innings of work, including one shutout and three complete games.

External links

Retrosheet

Major League Baseball pitchers
Boston Red Sox players
Fort Wayne Chiefs players
Kansas Jayhawks baseball players
Mobile Bears players
Pittsfield Hillies players
Springfield Senators players
Waterbury Brasscos players
Baseball players from Kansas
People from Republic County, Kansas
People from Clay Center, Kansas
1903 births
1959 deaths